Santo Mangano (born 28 August 1951) is a former Italian paralympic shooter and before a wheelchair fencer who won eight medals at the Summer Paralympics.

Married to wheelchair fencer Mariella Bertini, she too, like him, winner of eight Paralympic medals between Seoul 1988 and Atlanta 1996.

Achievements

See also
 Italian multiple medallists at the Summer Paralympics

References

External links
 
 Santo Mangano at CONI

1951 births
Living people
Paralympic shooters of Italy
Paralympic wheelchair fencers of Italy
Paralympic gold medalists for Italy
Paralympic silver medalists for Italy
Paralympic bronze medalists for Italy
Paralympic medalists in shooting
Paralympic medalists in wheelchair fencing
Wheelchair fencers at the 1984 Summer Paralympics
Shooters at the 1988 Summer Paralympics
Shooters at the 1992 Summer Paralympics
Shooters at the 1996 Summer Paralympics
Sportspeople from the Province of Messina
Medalists at the 1984 Summer Paralympics
Medalists at the 1988 Summer Paralympics
Medalists at the 1992 Summer Paralympics
Medalists at the 1996 Summer Paralympics